Bero Bass (born Bernas Avşar, on 23 July 1980 in Diyarbakır, Turkey) is a German rapper of Kurdish origin who settled in Cologne.

Biography
In July 2009 he was imprisoned after furiously attacking a 26-year-old male with a knife. He was awaiting his trial in prison before being released on bail in December 2009.

While he was in jail, his long-time friend OJ Kingpin, with whom he performed by the name La Honda as a rap duo, left the rap business, claiming gangster rap has no future and that they never earned any money from rapping.

Bero Bass passionely raps about Kurdistan in nearly all of his tracks, always saying 'Biji Kurdistan' (translating to Long Live Kurdistan) or waving Kurdish flags in his music videos. Bero Bass is an advocate for the Kurdish militant organisation PKK who have waged an 40 year insurgency against the Turkish state, as well as the Kurdish Peshmerga and this is demonstrated through his music tracks.

Bero Bass has recently released a track named Blick Richtung Sonne together with Bonn based rapper Xatar and the Kurdish folk singer Şivan Perwer.

Discography

Studio albums
2007: Gorillas im Nebel (with OJ Kingpin as La Honda)
2008: La Honda Nostra (with OJ Kingpin as La Honda)
2009: Basstime
2011: Gangstafilm
2013:  Gorillas im Nebel II (with OJ Kingpin as La honda)
2015: Animal
2019: Amigo

Other Release
 2007: Ich bin ein Outlaw (as La Honda with Eko Fresh and Outlawz)
 2009: 8 Kammern (with Manuellsen)
 2009: Playerhater
 2009: San Quentin
 2009: Das Leben ist
 2010: Kölner JVA
 2010: Ich mach es (with La Honda Allstars)

References

External links
 Official website

German rappers
Turkish emigrants to Germany
Kurds in Germany
1980 births
Living people
People from Diyarbakır
Musicians from Cologne
Criminals from North Rhine-Westphalia